Rowan David Oakes (born 14 October 1983) is an English actor. He is best known for his roles in the series The Pillars of the Earth, The Borgias, The White Queen, Victoria, Vikings: Valhalla, and for his discursive Natural History podcast, Trees A Crowd.

Early life and education
Oakes was born in Salisbury, Wiltshire, in 1983, the son of a Church of England canon. 

Oakes grew up in Fordingbridge, Hampshire.He was head boy at Bishop Wordsworth's School, in Salisbury. His first job was backstage at the Salisbury Playhouse. Oakes graduated with a First in English Literature from the University of Manchester. He graduated from the Bristol Old Vic Theatre School in 2007.

Career
Oakes began his career at Shakespeare's Globe, before taking roles at the Almeida Theatre and the Old Vic. Since appearing at Shakespeare's Globe at the outset of his career, Oakes has frequently performed in numerous rehearsed readings as part of their "Read Not Dead" initiative, including their landmark 200th reading of Philip Massinger's A New Way To Pay Old Debts; Oakes played Wellborn alongside a cast including Benjamin Whitrow, Alan Cox, and Nicholas Rowe. 

In 2006, Oakes performed a 90-minute abridged version of Much Ado About Nothing as part of the Royal Shakespeare Company's "Complete Works" festival along with his final year graduates from the Bristol Old Vic Theatre School. He alternated between playing Claudio and Verges alongside fellow graduate Matt Barber.

Oakes was present to accept the Jury Prize at the 2011 Romy Awards in Vienna alongside Donald Sutherland and Natalia Wörner.

Oakes came to prominence when he played the villainous William Hamleigh in the television miniseries The Pillars of the Earth (2010). The following year, Oakes was cast in the television series The Borgias (2011), airing on Showtime. Whilst shooting the second season, Oakes performed a cameo in the sequel to The Pillars of the Earth, World Without End (2012).

Between 2010 and 2013, Oakes had several roles playing villains on television—such as William Hamleigh in The Pillars of the Earth (2010), Juan Borgia in The Borgias (2011), and George, Duke of Clarence in The White Queen (2013). When he played Mr. Darcy in an adaptation of Pride and Prejudice at Open Air Theatre, Regent's Park in 2013, he said, "I've been playing bad guys back to back, so Darcy's a bit of an antidote!" In 2014, he starred in the original West End production of Shakespeare in Love at the Noël Coward Theatre as Christopher Marlowe. Oakes was nominated for both WhatsOnStage and Broadway World awards for his performance in Shakespeare in Love in 2015.

Other performances between 2008 and 2013 for "Read Not Dead" include an early quarto edition of Henry IV: Part One as Prince Hal opposite Benjamin Whitrow's Falstaff, Calderon's Life is a Dream (La Vida Es Sueno) as Segismundo, Taming Of A Shrew as Aurelias, The Spanish Tragedy as Lorenzo, The Return from Parnassus as Ingenioso, Bassianus as Geta, Gorboduc as a "smooth, almost oily" Arostus, John Lyly's Love's Metamorphosis as Montanus, and Thomas Middleton's Your Five Gallants as Tailby.

In a return to TV period dramas in 2015, Oakes guest-starred in both the third season of Endeavour with Shaun Evans and in BBC's limited series The Living and the Dead with Colin Morgan. He played Prince Ernest, brother of Queen Victoria's husband Prince Albert, in the 2016 ITV series Victoria. The role reunited Oakes with his Trinity co-star Tom Hughes, and Pillars of the Earth co-star Rufus Sewell.

In 2017, Oakes starred in the film adaptation of Albert Sánchez Piñol's novel Cold Skin, directed by Xavier Gens and co-starring Ray Stevenson and Aura Garrido. He also starred as Thomas Novachek in the London West End premiere of David Ives's play Venus in Fur at the Theatre Royal Haymarket. This production was directed by Patrick Marber and co-starred Natalie Dormer as Vanda.

Oakes played Earl Godwin in Vikings: Valhalla, the spin-off of the show Vikings, for Netflix.

Oakes set up a theatre company called Dog Ate Cake with a long-term theatrical collaborator Henry Bell.

In 2015 Oakes starred as Banquo in a charity fundraiser for the Shakespeare Schools Festival. The event was largely improvised by the actors and lawyers involved, but based on a framework written by Jonathan Myerson. The cast also included Christopher Eccleston as Macbeth, Haydn Gwynne as Lady Macbeth, Paterson Joseph as MacDuff, and Pippa Bennett-Warner as one of the Weird Sisters. The event interrupted the events of the original play following the death of Duncan, placing Macbeth on trial for murder. Oakes, Joseph, and Gwynne appeared as witnesses for the prosecution while Eccleston and Bennett-Warner played witnesses for the defence. The event was overseen by High Court Judge Sir Michael Burton; the QCs were John Kelsey-Fry, Jonathan Laidlaw, Dinah Rose, and Ian Winter, and the foreman of the jury was Jeremy Paxman.

In 2019, Oakes played Hamlet at Shakespeare's Rose Theatre, York. The Stage wrote that he "plays Hamlet with natural ease: he is clearly comfortable with the cadences of the language and he conveys meaning well." Both WhatsOnStage and the British Theatre Guide praised Oakes' performance, particularly his rapport with the audience, despite the production's more light-hearted take on the play.

Theatre direction 
Oakes has directed a number of theatre pieces alongside his acting career. In 2003 he took a stage adaptation of The Wicker Man to the Epping Forest Theatre Festival. Rehearsing in and around his hometown of Salisbury, Oakes "got kicked out of the [Cathedral] Close for rehearsing pagan rituals for [his] open-air production of The Wicker Man."

While at university, Oakes directed numerous plays including Martin McDonagh's Beauty Queen of Leenane, Harold Pinter's The Dumb Waiter and Anthony Minghella's Whale Music.

Also whilst at University in 2005, Oakes assisted director Natalie Wilson on a production of Smilin' Through that was co-produced by the Truant Company, Birmingham Repertory Theatre, and Contact Theatre, Manchester. Later that year, Oakes once again turned to literary adaptation, taking a production of Stephen King's The Boogeyman to the Edinburgh Festival Fringe.

With his and Bell's theatre company, Dog Ate Cake, in 2009 Oakes directed a small tour revival of John Maddison Morton's Box and Cox.

Oakes frequently directs at Shakespeare's Globe extending their "Read Not Dead" series, a study devoted to performing fully staged readings of the entirety of the Early Modern Canon of Drama. Most recently Oakes directed Robert Greene's The Honourable History of Friar Bacon and Friar Bungay and Lewis Theobald's "Happy Ending" version of John Webster's The Duchess of Malfi, "The Fatal Secret".

Oakes recently directed an extract of Robert Daborne's A Christian Turn'd Turk as part of a special "Read Not Dead" event at Shakespeare's Globe. Four directors with four scholars were teamed up with actors and presented their arguments and selected scenes at a special hustings event on Thursday 29 May 2014. Winning the event, teamed with Dr Emma Smith of Oxford University, Oakes directed the full play on Sunday 5 October 2014 in the Sam Wanamaker Playhouse.

Podcasts
In 2020, Oakes narrated an episode of Historic Royal Palaces' Outliers podcast. He appeared as Thomas Phelippes, a spy and code breaker in the court of Elizabeth I plotting the downfall of Mary, Queen of Scots.

Oakes is the presenter of the natural history podcast Trees A Crowd. The first episode was released on 25 February 2019 and featured Mark Frith.

Personal life

Oakes has been in a relationship with actress Natalie Dormer since 2018. Dormer gave birth to their daughter in 2021. The couple entered into a civil partnership in February 2023 in Bath, Somerset.

Oakes plays both the clarinet and bass clarinet, and is a bass singer. He is an avid follower of folk music, and continues to support the Bristol folk group Sheelanagig.

He has an extensive collection of canoes and is currently developing a comedy pilot based on this interest. His preferred canoe method is kayak but he also enjoys Canadian canoeing.

Charity work and advocacy

British Lung Foundation

Oakes, following his infant niece being diagnosed with a lung condition, has been heavily involved with raising awareness for and fundraising on behalf of the British Lung Foundation.

In 2013, Oakes collaborated with his Borgias castmate Holliday Grainger to make the short comedy film Goblin. Directed by Christian James, the film was screened at the 2014 Film 4 Fright Fest in their Shorts Showcase, and all profits from the sale of this film were donated to the British Lung Foundation.

Later in 2014, Oakes ran the length of the country to raise awareness for infant lung diseases for both the British Lung Foundation and ChILD Lung Foundation UK. In 2016, he joined with the BLF to promote their new Children's Hub to provide families with information and support.

Arts charities

Since 2014, Oakes has also been a friend of Anno's Africa, an arts-based charity working with Kenyan orphans and slum children, and has supported the UK based Shakespeare Schools Festival, most notably with and surrounding their "Trial of Macbeth" and "Trial of Richard III". In 2019, Oakes helped organise, and alongside Michael Palin, Twiggy and others, appeared in the "Just A Book" poster campaign on the London Underground. The campaign was created to support independent businesses and bookshops on British highstreets and also to raise funds for Anno’s Africa.

Environmental activism
Since 2019, Oakes has been an Ambassador for the Woodland Trust. On 9 October 2019, Oakes hosted a discussion at the 70th Cheltenham Literature Festival on the subject of "The Art of Trees".

Writing in an editorial for the Sunday Times on 2 November 2019, Oakes said:

On 30 January 2020, Oakes was a co-signatory, with the CEOs of The Wildlife Trusts, the National Trust, the Woodland Trust, the RSPB, the World Wide Fund for Nature, Friends of the Earth, Greenpeace, Buglife and Butterfly Conservation, and other notable environmental ambassadors and activists, on a letter written to Prime Minister Boris Johnson, and published in The Times, to get the UK government to rethink its stance on the second UK High Speed Rail Link along environmental and biodiversical lines.

On 21 June 2020, Oakes co-hosted the live-stream event The Big Wild Quiz for The Wildlife Trusts as part of their "30 Days Wild" campaign. Nine days later, on 30 June, alongside environmentalists and activists, including Chris Packham and Ellie Goulding, Oakes took part in the Climate Coalition's mass virtual lobby to focus the MPs to put people, climate and nature at the heart of the British nation’s recovery. He also hosted The Big Wild Quiz in 2021.

On 26 November 2020, Oakes became an ambassador for The Wildlife Trusts.

Filmography

Television

Film

Radio
 Oakes has performed with The Fitzrovia Radio Hour
 2008: A Dance to the Music of Time as Charles Stringham (BBC Radio 4)
 2017 - 2021: Seasons 1 to 4 of Foiled as Richie (BBC Radio Wales)—written by David Charles and Beth Granville, based on the Edinburgh Fringe show of the same name.

Stage

See also

 Ed Begley Jr.—American actor and environmentalist

References

External links

 davidoakes.co.uk, Oakes's official website
 
 Dog Ate Cake Official Website
 David Oakes Prints
 David Oakes at the London Theatre Database

20th-century English male actors
21st-century English male actors
Alumni of Bristol Old Vic Theatre School
Alumni of the University of Manchester
English environmentalists
English male film actors
English male musical theatre actors
English male stage actors
English male television actors
English male voice actors
Living people
People educated at Bishop Wordsworth's School
People from Fordingbridge
English male Shakespearean actors
1983 births